The Bodley Head is an English publishing house, founded in 1887 and existing as an independent entity until the 1970s. The name was used as an imprint of Random House Children's Books from 1987 to 2008. In April 2008, it was revived as an adult non-fiction imprint within Random House's CCV division.

As of 2019, The Bodley Head is an imprint of Vintage Publishing UK.

History
Originally Elkin Mathews and John Lane, The Bodley Head was a partnership set up in 1887 by John Lane (1854–1925) and Elkin Mathews (1851–1921), to trade in antiquarian books in London. It took its name from a bust of Sir Thomas Bodley, the eponymist of the Bodleian Library in Oxford, above the shop door. Lane and Mathews began in 1894 to publish works of ‘stylish decadence’, including the notorious literary periodical The Yellow Book. Also notable amongst Bodley Head's pre-Great War books were the two volume sets: Foundations of the Nineteenth Century (1910 and later editions, selling over fifty thousand copies), and Immanuel Kant, both by Houston Stewart Chamberlain.

Herbert George Jenkins was a manager at the firm during the first decade of the twentieth century, before leaving to set up his own publishing house in 1912. The Bodley Head became a private company in 1921. In 1926 it published the Book of Bodley Head Verse, an anthology edited by J. B. Priestley. The firm published some mainstream popular authors such as Arnold Bennett and Agatha Christie but ran into financial difficulties. Allen Lane, John Lane's nephew who had inherited control, left in 1936 to found Penguin Books. Before Allen Lane's new company was established, however, he published the first Penguins in 1935 under the imprint of The Bodley Head. Both "Penguin Books" and "The Bodley Head" appeared on the cover.

The Bodley Head continued after 1936 backed by a consortium of Allen & Unwin, Jonathan Cape, and J. M. Dent. In 1941, John Lane the Bodley Head took over two smaller publishing houses, Gerald Howe Ltd and Martin Hopkinson & Co., whose authors included Cecil Day Lewis and H. L. Mencken.

The firm was bought in 1957 by Ansbacher & Co., headed by Max Reinhardt. During this period Bodley Head published the work of authors such as George Bernard Shaw, Graham Greene, Charles Chaplin, William Trevor, Maurice Sendak, Muriel Spark, Alexander Solzhenitsyn, Sam Haskins and Alistair Cooke. Max Reinhardt was also responsible for the expansion of one of the outstanding children's books lists in modern publishing. The imprint was still important in the 1970s when it was drawn into the Jonathan Cape/Chatto & Windus group. The firm was sold to Random House in 1987, who published children's books under The Bodley Head name until 2008.

The archives of The Bodley Head Ltd are kept at Reading University.

Relaunch
The Bodley Head imprint was relaunched by Random House as an adult imprint in April 2008. Its two principal strands are stated to be books "of scholarship in both the humanities and sciences", and books which "contribute to the intellectual and cultural climate of our times".

See also

:Category:The Bodley Head books
 Max Reinhardt
 Books in the United Kingdom

Bibliography
 Stetz, Margaret; Lasner, Mark Samuels (1990). England in the 1890s: Literary Publishing at the Bodley Head. Georgetown Univ Press. .
 J. W. Lambert and Michael Ratcliffe The Bodley Head 1887–1987. The story of John Lane, Allen Lane, Unwin and Max Reinhardt and their links with Bodley Head. .

References

External links

Archives of the Bodley Head Ltd at Reading University

Book publishing companies of the United Kingdom
Random House
Publishing companies established in 1887
1887 establishments in England
British companies established in 1887